Catherine J. Frieman is an archaeologist and associate professor at the Australian National University. Her research investigates conservatism and innovation, and she is a specialist in material culture and technology.

Education 
She graduated with a BA in archaeological studies from Yale. Frieman completed her MSt and DPhil at the University of Oxford. She held a Rhodes scholarship. Her thesis, completed in 2010, investigated lithic objects from 4th-2nd millennium BC northwest Europe which are commonly considered as skeuomorphs, in order to investigate the adoption of metallurgy and metal objects.

Career 
Frieman was appointed as a lecturer at ANU in after having held post-doctoral positions at Oxford, and lecturing at the University of Nottingham. She currently holds an ARC DECRA fellowship for the project Conservatism as a dynamic response to the diffusion of innovations. Frieman has co-edited volumes on flint daggers in prehistoric Europe and Bronze Age coastal archaeology finds in south-west Britain. She is co-editor of the European Journal of Archaeology. She has received teaching excellence awards from CASS, the Australian Office of Learning and Teaching and the ANU Vice-Chancellor's office, and has been appointed as an ANU Distinguished Educator.

Frieman is the co-director of the Southeast Kernow Archaeological Survey, which is investigating the Neolithic to later Iron Age period in Cornwall.

Selected publications 

 Frieman, C 2012. Going to pieces at the funeral: Completeness and complexity in early Bronze Age jet 'necklace' assemblages. Journal of Social Archaeology  12(3): 334–355.
Frieman, C 2014. Double Edged blades : re-visiting the British (and Irish) flint daggers. Proceedings of the Prehistoric Society 80: 33–65.
Frieman, C & Eriksen, B, eds, 2015. Flint Daggers in Prehistoric Europe. Oxford: Oxbow Books.
Frieman, C, Bruck, J, Rebay-Salisbury, K et al. 2017. Aging Well: Treherne's 'Warrior's Beauty' Two Decades Later. European Journal of Archaeology 20(1): 36 – 73.
 Frieman, C, Piper, P, Nguyen, K et al. 2017. Rach Nui: Ground stone technology in coastal Neolithic settlements of southern Vietnam. Antiquity 91 (358): 933–946.
Frieman, C & Janz, L 2018. A Very Remote Storage Box Indeed: The Importance of Doing Archaeology with Old Museum Collections. Journal of Field Archaeology 43(4): 257–268.

References 

Living people
Alumni of the University of Oxford
Yale College alumni
American archaeologists
Academic staff of the Australian National University
Year of birth missing (living people)
American women archaeologists
American women academics
21st-century American women